At the 1984 Summer Olympics in Los Angeles, twelve events in sprint canoe racing were contested on Lake Casitas.  The women's K-4 500 m event was introduced to the Olympic program at these Games.

Medal table

Medal summary

Men's events

Women's events

See also
 Canoeing at the Friendship Games

References
1984 Summer Olympics official report Volume 2, Part 2. pp. 364–71. 
 

 
1984 Summer Olympics events
1984